Telecom Telecommunication Tower Heidelberg is a 102 meter tall (originally 80m, raised to 102m in the 1980s) telecommunication tower built of reinforced concrete in the late 1950s on the mountain Königsstuhl near Heidelberg, Germany. Nearby are Fernsehturm Heidelberg and Telecommunication Tower of US-Forces Heidelberg. Like the other two towers, this structure has been converted from steel beams to reinforced concrete.

Only three analog FM radio channels are currently transmitted. Its main use is microwave communications for Deutsche Telekom also known as T-COM (t-home/t-mobile).

See also 
 List of towers

External links 
 http://skyscraperpage.com/diagrams/?b60552

Communication towers in Germany
Buildings and structures in Heidelberg
1958 establishments in West Germany
Towers completed in 1958